Eslamabad may refer to the following places in Iran:

Alborz Province
 Eslamabad, Alborz, a village

Ardabil Province
 Eslamabad, Ardabil, a village in Nir County
 Shahsavarlu, a village in Kowsar County
 Eslamabad-e Jadid, a village in Parsabad County
 Eslamabad-e Qadim, a city in Parsabad County
 Eslamabad-e Sofla, Ardabil, a village in Parsabad County

Bushehr Province
 Eslamabad, Dashtestan, a village in Dashtestan County
 Eslamabad, Dashti, a village in Dashti County
 Eslamabad, Ganaveh, a village in Ganaveh County
 Eslamabad, Jam, a village in Jam County

Chaharmahal and Bakhtiari Province
 Eslamabad, Ardal, a village in Ardal County
 Eslamabad, Borujen, a village in Borujen County
 Eslamabad, Kiar, a village in Kiar County
 Eslamabad, Naghan, a village in Kiar County
 Eslamabad, Lordegan, a village in Lordegan County
 Eslamabad, Falard, a village in Lordegan County
 Eslamabad-e Yek, Chaharmahal and Bakhtiari, a village in Lordegan County

East Azerbaijan Province
 Eslamabad, Charuymaq, a village in Charuymaq County
 Eslamabad, Mianeh, a village in Mianeh County
 Eslamabad, Sarab, a village in Sarab County
 Eslamabad-e Mashnaq, a village in Shabestar County

Fars Province

Arsanjan County
Eslamabad, Arsanjan, a village in Arsanjan County

Darab County
Eslamabad, Bakhtajerd, a village in Darab County
Eslamabad, Qaryah ol Kheyr, a village in Darab County
Eslamabad-e Ghani, a village in Darab County

Eqlid County
Eslamabad, Eqlid, a village in Eqlid County

Fasa County
Eslamabad, Fasa, a village in Fasa County

Firuzabad County
Eslamabad, Firuzabad, a village in Firuzabad County

Jahrom County
Eslamabad, Jahrom, a village in Jahrom County

Kazerun County
Eslamabad, Kazerun, a village in Kazerun County
Eslamabad, Famur, a village in Kazerun County
Eslamabad, Jereh, a village in Kazerun County
Eslamabad, Khesht, a village in Kazerun County
Eslamabad-e Tang Shib, a village in Kazerun County

Kharameh County
Eslamabad, Kharameh, a village in Kharameh County

Larestan County
Eslamabad, Larestan, a village in Larestan County

Mamasani County
Eslamabad, Mamasani, a village in Mamasani County
Eslamabad, Doshman Ziari, a village in Mamasani County
Eslamabad, Javid-e Mahuri, a village in Mamasani County

Marvdasht County
Eslamabad, Marvdasht, a village in Marvdasht County

Neyriz County
Eslamabad, Neyriz, a village in Neyriz County
Eslamabad, Qatruyeh, a village in Neyriz County

Pasargad County
Eslamabad, Pasargad, a village in Pasargad County

Qir and Karzin County
Eslamabad, Qir and Karzin, a village in Qir and Karzin County

Rostam County
Eslamabad, Rostam, a village in Rostam County

Sarvestan County
Eslamabad, Sarvestan, a village in Sarvestan County

Sepidan County
Eslamabad, Sepidan, a village in Sepidan County

Shiraz County
Eslamabad, Shiraz, a village in Shiraz County
Eslamabad, Kuh Mareh Sorkhi, a village in Shiraz County
Eslamabad-e Chehel Cheshmeh, a village in Shiraz County

Gilan Province
Eslamabad, Gilan, a village in Sowme'eh Sara County
Eslamabad Rural District (Gilan Province), in Rasht County

Golestan Province
 Eslamabad, Maraveh Tappeh, a village in Maraveh Tappeh County
 Eslamabad-e Fenderesk, a village in Aliabad County
 Eslamabad-e Mazraeh Shomareh-ye Do, a village in Aliabad County
 Eslamabad-e Mazraeh Shomareh-ye Yek, a village in Aliabad County
 Eslamabad-e Bala, a village in Aqqala County
 Eslamabad-e Pain, Golestan, a village in Aqqala County
 Eslamabad-e Qeshlaq, a village in Azadshahr County
 Eslamabad-e Gonbad, a village in Gonbad-e Qabus County
 Eslamabad-e Jelin, a village in Gorgan County
 Eslamabad-e Shadeh, a village in Kordkuy County
 Eslamabad-e Olya, Golestan, a village in Ramian County
 Eslamabad-e Sofla, Golestan, a village in Ramian County

Hamadan Province
 Eslamabad, Bahar, a village in Bahar County
 Eslamabad, Malayer, a village in Malayer County
 Eslamabad, alternate name of Shad Kandi, a village in Malayer County

Hormozgan Province
 Eslamabad, Bandar Abbas, a village in Bandar Abbas County
 Eslamabad, Bandar Lengeh, a village in Bandar Lengeh County
 Eslamabad, Bashagard, a village in Bashagard County
 Eslamabad, Minab, a village in Minab County
 Eslamabad, Senderk, a village in Minab County
 Eslamabad, Rudan, a village in Rudan County

Ilam Province
 Eslamabad-e Olya, Ilam, a village in Darreh Shahr County
 Eslamabad-e Sofla, Ilam, a village in Darreh Shahr County

Isfahan Province
 Eslamabad, Ardestan, a village in Ardestan County
 Eslamabad-e Makdin, a village in Fereydunshahr County
 Eslamabad-e Mugui, a village in Fereydunshahr County
 Eslamabad, Najafabad, a village in Najafabad County
 Eslamabad, Hana, a village in Semirom County
 Eslamabad, Vardasht, a village in Semirom County
 Eslamabad-e Qarakhlu, a village in Semirom County
 Eslamabad, Shahreza, a village in Shahreza County

Kerman Province
 Eslamabad, Arzuiyeh, a village in Arzuiyeh County
 Eslamabad, Soghan, a village in Arzuiyeh County
 Eslamabad, Baft, a village in Baft County
 Eslamabad-e Shomareh-ye Seh, a village in Baft County
 Eslamabad, Bam, a village in Bam County
 Eslamabad-e 21, a village in Bardsir County
 Eslamabad-e Chah Narenj, a village in Faryab County
 Eslamabad-e Darvish Khanka, a village in Faryab County
 Eslamabad, Jiroft, a village in Jiroft County
 Eslamabad, Sarduiyeh, a village in Jiroft County
 Eslamabad Rural District (Jiroft County), an administrative subdivision of Jiroft County
 Eslamabad-e Dowlatabad, a village in Kerman County
 Eslamabad (1), a village in Manujan County
 Eslamabad (2), a village in Manujan County
 Eslamabad, Qaleh Ganj, a village in Qaleh Ganj County
 Eslamabad-e Kahan Changar, a village in Qaleh Ganj County
 Eslamabad-e Sar Meydan, a village in Qaleh Ganj County
 Eslamabad, Rabor, a village in Rabor County
 Eslamabad, Rafsanjan, a village in Rafsanjan County
 Eslamabad-e Kahur Khoshk, a village in Rigan County
 Eslamabad, Dehaj, a village in Shahr-e Babak County
 Eslamabad, Chahar Gonbad, a village in Sirjan County
 Eslamabad, Pariz, a village in Sirjan County
 Eslamabad, Zeydabad, a village in Sirjan County
 Reyhan Shahr, formerly Eslamabad, a city in Zarand County
 Eslamabad Rural District (Zarand County), an administrative subdivision of Zarand County

Kermanshah Province
 Eslamabad-e Gharb, a city in Kermanshah Province, Iran
 Eslamabad-e Gharb County, an administrative subdivision of Iran
 Eslamabad, Kermanshah, a village in Kangavar County
 Eslamabad-e Bezahrud, a village in Sahneh County
 Eslamabad-e Olya, Kermanshah, a village in Sahneh County
 Eslamabad-e Sofla, Kermanshah, a village in Sahneh County

Khuzestan Province
 Eslamabad, Andika, a village in Andika County
 Eslamabad, Bagh-e Malek, a village in Bagh-e Malek County
 Eslamabad, Behbahan, a village in Behbahan County
 Eslamabad-e Olya, Khuzestan, a village in Behbahan County
 Eslamabad-e Sofla, Khuzestan, a village in Behbahan County
 Eslamabad, Dezful, a village in Dezful County
 Eslamabad, Shahi, a village in Dezful County
 Eslamabad, Haftgel, a village in Haftgel County
 Eslamabad, Izeh, a village in Izeh County
 Eslamabad, Karun, a village in Karun County
 Eslamabad-e Do, a village in Karun County
 Eslamabad, Omidiyeh, a village in Omidiyeh County
 Eslamabad, Ramshir, a village in Ramshir County

Kohgiluyeh and Boyer-Ahmad Province
 Eslamabad-e Baba Ahmad, a village in Bahmai County
 Eslamabad, Basht, a village in Basht County
 Eslamabad, Kakan, a village in Boyer-Ahmad County
 Eslamabad, Sarrud-e Jonubi, a village in Boyer-Ahmad County
 Eslamabad, Sarrud-e Shomali, a village in Boyer-Ahmad County
 Eslamabad, Sepidar, a village in Boyer-Ahmad County
 Eslamabad-e Heydarabad, a village in Boyer-Ahmad County
 Eslamabad-e Deh Now, a village in Charam County
 Eslamabad-e Mashayekh, a village in Charam County
 Eslamabad, Dana, a village in Dana County
 Eslamabad-e Bagh-e Nar, a village in Gachsaran County
 Eslamabad-e Lishtar, a village in Gachsaran County
 Eslamabad-e Nazmakan, a village in Gachsaran County

Kurdistan Province
 Eslamabad, Bijar, a village in Bijar County
 Eslamabad, Divandarreh, a village in Divandarreh County
 Eslamabad, Kamyaran, a village in Kamyaran County
 Eslamabad, Qorveh, a village in Qorveh County
 Eslamabad, Saqqez, a village in Saqqez County
 Eslamabad, Ziviyeh, a village in Saqqez County

Lorestan Province

Aligudarz County
 Eslamabad, Aligudarz, a village in Aligudarz County
 Eslamabad-e Sheykh Miri, a village in Aligudarz County
 Eslamabad, Besharat, a village in Aligudarz County
 Eslamabad Mohammad Hoseyn, a village in Aligudarz County

Borujerd County
 Eslamabad, Borujerd, a village in Borujerd County

Delfan County
Eslamabad Gamasyab Olya, a village in Delfan County
Eslamabad Gamasyab Sofla, a village in Delfan County

Dowreh County
Eslamabad, Dowreh, a village in Dowreh County

Khorramabad County
Eslamabad Barg Beydi, a village in Khorramabad County
Eslamabad, alternate name of Bid Hal, a village in Khorramabad County
Eslamabad-e Olya, Khorramabad, a village in Khorramabad County
Eslamabad-e Sofla, Lorestan, a village in Khorramabad County

Kuhdasht County
Gari Eslamabad, a village in Kuhdasht County

Pol-e Dokhtar County
Eslamabad-e Yaran Parviz, a village in Pol-e Dokhtar County
Eslamabad-e Olya, Pol-e Dokhtar, a village in Pol-e Dokhtar County

Selseleh County
Eslamabad, alternate name of Rig-e Sefid, Selseleh, a village in Selseleh County

Mazandaran Province
 Eslamabad, Amol, a village in Amol County
 Eslamabad, Fereydunkenar, a village in Fereydunkenar County
 Eslamabad, Mahmudabad, a village in Mahmudabad County
 Eslamabad, Miandorud, a village in Miandorud County
 Eslamabad, Nowshahr, a village in Nowshahr County

North Khorasan Province
 Eslamabad, North Khorasan, a village in Maneh and Samalqan County
 Eslamabad-e Karkhaneh-ye Qand, a village in Shirvan County
 Eslamabad-e Kord, a village in Maneh and Samalqan County
 Eslamabad, alternate name of Kharashah, a village in Jajrom County

Qazvin Province
 Eslamabad, Qazvin, a village in Abyek County, Qazvin Province, Iran

Qom Province
 Eslamabad, Qom, a village in Qom Province, Iran
 Eslamabad, Salafchegan, a village in Qom Province, Iran

Razavi Khorasan Province
 Eslamabad, Bardaskan, a village in Bardaskan County
 Eslamabad, Chenaran, a village in Chenaran County
 Eslamabad, Mashhad, a village in Mashhad County
 Eslamabad-e Chahar Gavareh, a village in Mashhad County
 Eslamabad, Nishapur, a village in Nishapur County
 Eslamabad-e Arab, a village in Nishapur County
 Eslamabad-e Lakazi, a village in Nishapur County
 Eslamabad, Quchan, a village in Quchan County
 Eslamabad, Bajgiran, a village in Quchan County
 Eslamabad, Rashtkhvar, a village in Rashtkhvar County
 Eslamabad-e Khalaj, a village in Torbat-e Heydarieh County
 Eslamabad, Torbat-e Jam, a village in Torbat-e Jam County

Semnan Province
 Eslamabad, Garmsar, a village in Garmsar County
 Eslamabad, Shahrud, a village in Shahrud County

Sistan and Baluchestan Province
 Eslamabad, Bampur, a village in Bampur County
 Eslamabad-e Pain, Sistan and Baluchestan, a village in Chabahar County
 Eslamabad, Irandegan, a village in Khash County
 Eslamabad, Gowhar Kuh, a village in Khash County
 Eslamabad, alternate name of Kalleh-ye Espid-e Eslamabad, a village in Khash County
 Eslamabad-e Garnechin, a village in Khash County

South Khorasan Province
 Eslamabad, Shusef, a village in Nehbandan County

Tehran Province
 Eslamabad, Damavand, a village in Damavand County
 Eslamabad, Azimiyeh, a village in Rey County
 Eslamabad, Ghaniabad, a village in Rey County

West Azerbaijan Province
 Eslamabad, Mahabad, a village in Mahabad County
 Eslamabad, Miandoab, a village in Miandoab County
 Eslamabad, Naqadeh, a village in Naqadeh County
 Eslamabad, Oshnavieh, a village in Oshnavieh County
 Eslamabad, Sardasht, a village in Sardasht County
 Eslamabad, Urmia, a village in Urmia County

Yazd Province
Eslamabad, Khatam, a village in Khatam County
Eslamabad, Saduq, a village in Saduq County
Eslamabad, Taft, a village in Taft County

Zanjan Province
 Eslamabad, Khodabandeh, a village in Khodabandeh County
 Eslamabad, Khorramdarreh, a village in Khorramdarreh County
 Eslamabad, Zanjan, a village in Zanjan County

See also
 Eslamabad Rural District (disambiguation)
 Eslamabad-e Olya (disambiguation)
 Eslamabad-e Sofla (disambiguation)
 Islamabad (disambiguation)
 Shahrak-e Eslamabad (disambiguation)